, formerly , is a former member of the Imperial Family of Japan. She is the fourth child and second daughter of Takahito, Prince Mikasa and Yuriko, Princess Mikasa. She is the wife of the 16th-generation Soshitsu Sen.

Education

For her early education as a child, Princess Masako attended Gakushuin Elementary School and then Gakushuin Women's Secondary School. She later enrolled in the Department of Japanese Language and Literature, Faculty of Letters, Gakushuin University. After completing three years, she was sent to a boarding school in Switzerland and moved to Paris for studying in the University of Sorbonne.

Marriage and family
Princess Masako married Masayuki Sen (b. 1956), the elder son of Sōshitsu Sen XV, on 14 October 1983. Upon her marriage, she gave up her imperial title and left the Japanese Imperial Family as required by Imperial Law, and took the surname of her husband. He succeeded his father and thus became , the sixteenth hereditary grand master (Iemoto) of the Urasenke Japanese Tea Ceremony School, in December 2002.

The couple have two sons and one daughter:
 Akifumi Kikuchi (born 10 November 1984), had his surname officially changed from "Sen" to "Kikuchi" in 2014
 Makiko Sakata (born 11 July 1987), married in 2017 to Munehiro Sakata
 Takafumi Sen (born 6 July 1990)

Official activities
Masako Sen has been active in the Soroptimist International (SI) organization in Japan. She was President of the SI Kyoto Club in 2006, and again, in 2016. In 2012, she was elected as the 14th Governor of Japan's Soroptimist International of the Americas (SIA) Chuo Region. In March, 2018, she was elected as Chair of the Soroptimist Japan Foundation.

Titles and styles

 23 October 1951 – 14 October 1983: Her Imperial Highness Princess Masako
 14 October 1983 – present: Mrs. Soshitsu Sen

Honours

National honours
 Grand Cordon of the Order of the Precious Crown

Ancestry

References 

1951 births
Living people
Japanese princesses

Grand Cordons (Imperial Family) of the Order of the Precious Crown
Gakushuin University alumni